The 2010 Camden Council election took place on 6 May 2010 to elect members of Camden London Borough Council in London, England. The whole council was up for election and the Labour party gained overall control of the council from no overall control.

Election result
The results saw Labour gain a majority on the council ousting the Liberal Democrat and Conservative alliance that had controlled the council. Labour won 30 seats, while the Liberal Democrats were reduced to 13 seats, and the Conservatives were reduced to 10 seats. The Green Party also lost seats, being reduced to 1 seat in Highgate, after losing the other 2 seats in the ward to Labour.

Labour gained seats from the Liberal Democrats in Camden Town with Primrose Hill, Cantelowes, Kentish Town and Kilburn, while the Conservatives lost seats in Bloomsbury and Gospel Oak to Labour. However, the Conservatives did make gains in Belsize. Following the election Andrew Marshall resigned as leader of the Conservative group and was succeeded by Martin Davies.

The election in Haverstock was delayed after the death of Liberal Democrat councillor Syed Hoque during the campaign. The delayed election in Haverstock was held on 25 May 2010 and saw the Liberal Democrats hold all 3 seats in the ward. This brought the composition of the council to 30 Labour, 13 Liberal Democrats, 10 Conservatives and 1 Green Party.

|}

Ward results
Existing Councillor seeking re-election denoted by asterisk (*).

Belsize

Bloomsbury

Camden Town with Primrose Hill

Cantelowes

Fortune Green

Frognal and Fitzjohns

Gospel Oak

Hampstead Town

Haverstock

Highgate

Holborn and Covent Garden

Kentish Town

Kilburn

King's Cross

Regent's Park

St Pancras and Somers Town

Swiss Cottage

West Hampstead

References

2010
2010 London Borough council elections
May 2010 events in the United Kingdom